Judicial activism is a judicial philosophy holding that the courts can and should go beyond the applicable law to consider broader societal implications of its decisions. It is sometimes used as an antonym of judicial restraint. The term usually implies that judges make rulings based on their own views rather than on precedent. The definition of judicial activism and the specific decisions that are activist are controversial political issues. The question of judicial activism is closely related to judicial interpretation, statutory interpretation, and separation of powers.

Etymology
Arthur Schlesinger Jr. introduced the term "judicial activism" in a January 1947 Fortune magazine article titled "The Supreme Court: 1947".

The phrase has been controversial since its beginning. An article by Craig Green, "An Intellectual History of Judicial Activism," is critical of Schlesinger's use of the term; "Schlesinger's original introduction of judicial activism was doubly blurred: not only did he fail to explain what counts as activism, he also declined to say whether activism is good or bad."

Even before this phrase was first used, the general concept already existed. For example, Thomas Jefferson referred to the "despotic behaviour" of Federalist federal judges, in particular Chief Justice John Marshall.

Definitions

A survey of judicial review in practice during the last three decades shows that judicial activism has characterized the decisions of the Supreme Court at different times. 
  
Black's Law Dictionary defines judicial activism as a "philosophy of judicial decision-making whereby judges allow their personal views about public policy, among other factors, to guide their decisions."

Political science professor Bradley Canon has posited six dimensions along which judge courts may be perceived as activist: majoritarianism, interpretive stability, interpretive fidelity, substance/democratic process, specificity of policy, and availability of an alternate policymaker.

David A. Strauss has argued that judicial activism can be narrowly defined as one or more of three possible actions: overturning laws as unconstitutional, overturning judicial precedent, and ruling against a preferred interpretation of the constitution.

Others have been less confident of the term's meaning, finding it instead to be little more than a rhetorical shorthand. Kermit Roosevelt III has argued that "in practice 'activist' turns out to be little more than a rhetorically charged shorthand for decisions the speaker disagrees with". Roosevelt defines judicial activism as "an approach to the exercise of judicial review, or a description of a particular judicial decision, in which a judge is generally considered more willing to decide constitutional issues and to invalidate legislative or executive actions."; likewise, the solicitor general under George W. Bush, Theodore Olson, said in an interview on Fox News Sunday, with regard to a case for same-sex marriage he had successfully litigated, that "most people use the term 'judicial activism' to explain decisions that they don't like." Supreme Court Justice Anthony Kennedy said that, "An activist court is a court that makes a decision you don't like."

Echoed sentiments in many articles, such as "The courts have gradually abandoned their proper role of policing the structural limits on government and neutrally interpreting the laws and constitutional provisions without personal bias."

Richard H. Fallon Jr. quotes Justice Holmes "great cases... make bad law." in their explanation on presidential overreach. "Presidents frequently interpret their own powers without judicial review and where executive precedents play a large role in subsequent interpretive debates, some of the historical assertions of presidential authority that stretch constitutional and statutory language the furthest seem hard to condemn in light of the practical stakes."

Debate

Detractors of judicial activism charge that it usurps the power of the elected branches of government and of legislatively created agencies, damaging the rule of law and democracy. Defenders of judicial activism say that in many cases it is a legitimate form of judicial review and that the interpretation of the law must change with changing times.

A third view is that so-called "objective" or "formalist" interpretation of the law does not exist. According to law professor Brian Z. Tamanaha, "Throughout the so-called formalist age, it turns out, many prominent judges and jurists acknowledged that there were gaps and uncertainties in the law and that judges must sometimes make choices."
Under this view, any judge's use of judicial discretion will necessarily be shaped by that judge's personal and professional experience and his or her views on a wide range of matters, from legal and juridical philosophy to morals and ethics. This implies a tension between granting flexibility (to enable the dispensing of justice) and placing bounds on that flexibility (to hold judges to ruling from legal grounds rather than extralegal ones).

Some proponents of a stronger judiciary argue that the judiciary helps provide checks and balances and should grant itself an expanded role to counterbalance the effects of transient majoritarianism, i.e., there should be an increase in the powers of a branch of government that is not directly subject to the electorate, so that the majority cannot dominate or oppress any particular minority through its elective powers.  Other scholars have proposed that judicial activism is most appropriate when it restrains the tendency of democratic majorities to act out of passion and prejudice rather than after reasoned deliberation.

Moreover, they argue that the judiciary strikes down actions of both elected and unelected officials, in some instances acts of legislative bodies reflecting the view the transient majority may have had at the moment of passage and not necessarily the view the transient majority may have at the time the legislation is struck down. Also, the judges that are appointed are usually appointed by previously elected executive officials so that judges' philosophy should reflect that of those who nominated them, and that an independent judiciary is a great asset to civil society since special interests are unable to dictate their version of constitutional interpretation with the threat of stopping political donations.

United States examples 
The following rulings have been characterized as judicial activism.

 Brown v. Board of Education – 1954 Supreme Court ruling ordering the desegregation of public schools.
 Roe v. Wade – 1973 Supreme Court ruling creating the constitutional right to an abortion.
 Bush v. Gore – The United States Supreme Court case between the major-party candidates in the 2000 presidential election, George W. Bush and Al Gore. The justices voted 5–4 to halt the recount of ballots in Florida and as a result Bush was chosen as president.
 Citizens United v. Federal Election Commission – 2010 Supreme Court decision declaring congressionally enacted limitations on corporate political spending and transparency as unconstitutional restrictions on free speech.
 Obergefell v. Hodges – 2015 Supreme Court decision declaring same-sex marriage as a right guaranteed under the Due Process Clause and the Fourteenth Amendment.
Janus v. AFSCME – a 2018 Supreme Court decision addressing whether unions can require dues from all workers who benefit from collective bargaining agreements. The decision overturned the 41-year-old precedent of Abood v. Detroit Board of Education.
Department of Homeland Security v. Regents of the University of California – a 2020 Supreme Court decision addressing whether the Department of Homeland Security under President Donald Trump had the authority to dismantle the Deferred Action for Childhood Arrivals program initiated by Executive Order under former President Barack Obama.

Some US Presidents have also commented on the idea. When President George W. Bush announced his first nominations for the federal bench, he declared:

Outside the United States

While the term was first coined and is often used in the United States, it has also been applied in other countries, particularly common law jurisdictions.

Canada

Judges in Canada are given the power to interpret law passed down from the legislature, discretionary power to resolve disputes, and the power to use common law and accepted judicial policy to render judgement. By the principle of separation of powers, a strong tradition in Canada and accepted practice, judges should respect the role of the legislature to create law. Judges are also charged to impartially apply the law as it is written.

Canada has a legal system that is derived from the British system of common law (and the French system in the province of Quebec). Canadian Courts have a structure that relies more heavily on the discretion of its judges, policy and common law to create a workable body of law. Thus Canada's legal system may have more potential for conflicts with regards to the accusation of judicial activism, as compared to the United States. 

Former Chief Justice of the Supreme Court of Canada Beverley McLachlin has stated that:

the charge of judicial activism may be understood as saying that judges are pursuing a particular political agenda, that they are allowing their political views to determine the outcome of cases before them. ... It is a serious matter to suggest that any branch of government is deliberately acting in a manner that is inconsistent with its constitutional role.

Such accusations often arise in response to rulings involving the Canadian Charter of Rights and Freedoms. Specifically, rulings that have favoured the extension of gay rights, have prompted accusations of judicial activism. Justice Rosalie Abella is a particularly common target of those who perceive activism on the Supreme Court of Canada bench.

The recent judgment  Chaoulli v Quebec [2005] 1 R.C.S. which declared unconstitutional the prohibition of private healthcare insurance, and challenged the principle of Canadian universal health care in Quebec was deemed by many as a prominent example of judicial activism. The judgment was written by Justice Deschamps with a tight majority of 4 against 3.

European Union

In the Cassis de Dijon Case, the European Court of Justice ruled the German laws prohibiting sales of liquors with alcohol percentages between 15% and 25% conflicted with EU laws. This ruling confirmed that EU law has primacy over member-state law.
When the treaties are unclear, they leave room for the Court to interpret them in different ways. When EU treaties are negotiated, it is difficult to get all governments to agree on a clear set of laws. In order to get a compromise, governments agree to leave a decision on an issue to the Court.

The Court can only practice judicial activism to the extent the EU Governments leave room for interpretation in the treaties.

The Court makes important rulings that set the agenda for further EU integration, but it cannot happen without the consensual support of the member-states.

In the Irish referendum on the Lisbon Treaty many issues not directly related to the treaty, such as abortion were included in the debate because of worries that the Lisbon Treaty will enable the European Court of Justice to make activist rulings in these areas.
After the rejection of the Lisbon Treaty in Ireland, the Irish Government received concessions from the rest of the member states of the European Union to make written guarantees that the EU will under no circumstances interfere with Irish abortion, taxation or military neutrality. 
Ireland voted on the Lisbon Treaty a second time in 2009, with a 67.13% majority voting Yes to the treaty.

India
India has a recent history of judicial activism, originating after the Emergency in India which saw attempts by the Government to control the judiciary. Public Interest Litigation was thus an instrument devised by the courts to reach out directly to the public, and take cognizance though the litigant may not be the victim. "Suo motu" cognizance allows the courts to take up such cases on its own. The trend has been supported as well criticized. New York Times author Gardiner Harris sums this up as

All such rulings carry the force of Article 39A of the Constitution of India, although before and during the Emergency the judiciary desisted from "wide and elastic" interpretations, termed Austinian, because Directive Principles of State Policy are non-justiciable. This despite the constitutional provisions for judicial review and B R Ambedkar arguing in the Constituent Assembly Debates that "judicial review, particularly writ jurisdiction, could provide quick relief against abridgment of Fundamental Rights and ought to be at the heart of the Constitution."

Fundamental Rights as enshrined in the Constitution have been subjected to wide review, and have now been said to encompass a right to privacy, right to livelihood and right to education, among others. The 'basic structure' of the Constitution has been mandated by the Supreme Court not to be alterable, notwithstanding the powers of the Legislature under Article 368. This doctrine has been recognized by several countries like Bangladesh, Pakistan and Malaysia as part of their jurisprudence. Other countries such as Singapore, Belize and Uganda has heard important cases regarding the use of this doctrine in their own countries.
The modern trend of judicial activism began in 1973 when the Allahabad High Court rejected the candidature of Indira Gandhi in State of Uttar Pradesh v. Raj Narain. The introduction of public interest litigation by Justice V.R. Krishna Iyer further expanded its scope.
Recent examples quoted include the order to Delhi Government to convert the Auto rickshaw to CNG, a move believed to have reduced Delhi's erstwhile acute smog problem (it is now argued to be back) and contrasted with that of Beijing.

Israel

The Israeli approach to judicial activism has transformed significantly in the three decades since the 1992 Constitutional Revolution led by Aharon Barak, and, as of 2022, presents an especially broad version of robust judicial review and intervention. Additionally, taking into consideration the intensity of public life in Israel and the challenges that the country faces (including security threats), the case law of the Israeli Supreme Court touches on diverse and controversial public matters.

United Kingdom 
The British courts were largely deferential towards their attitudes against the government before the 1960s. Since then, judicial activism has been well established throughout the UK. One of the first cases for this activism to be present was the Conway v Rimmer (1968); a Public-interest immunity, previously known as Crown privilege. Previously, a claim like this would be defined as definitive, but the judges had slowly begun to adopt more of an activist line approach. This had become more prominent in which government actions were overturned by the courts. This can inevitably lead to clashes between the courts against the government as shown in the Miller case consisting of the 2016 Conservative government. The perceptions of judicial activism derived from the number of applications for judicial review made to the courts, which led to R (Miller) v The Prime Minister and Cherry v Advocate General for Scotland in 2019, joint landmark constitutional law cases on the limits of the power of royal prerogative to prorogue the Parliament of the United Kingdom. This can be seen throughout the 1980s, where there were about 500 applications within a year. This number dramatically increased as by 2013, there were 15,594 applications. This trend has become more frequent as time passes along, possibly pointing to a greater influence in the UK courts against the government. Along with the number of applications submitted to the courts, in some instances it has attracted media attention. For instance, in 1993, William Rees-Mogg had challenged the Conservative government to ratify the Maastricht Treaty (a legislation that self described as "a new stage in the process of European integration"), which eventually had formed into the European Union and initiated the Eurodollar. This was rejected by the Divisional Court and attracted large amounts of media attention to this case. Through these components it is largely evident that judicial activism should not be exaggerated. Ultimately, judicial activism is greatly established throughout the UK as the courts are becoming more prone to scrutinise at their own will, and at times, reject government legislation that they deem to be not within balance to the UK constitution and becoming more visible doing so.

Obviously since the United Kingdom's judiciary powers do not come from electoral methods, they differ in strengths, weaknesses, opportunities, and threats compared to a free and democratic system. Brenda Marjorie Hale, Baroness Hale of Richmond, DBE, PC, FBA, raises the popular concern that this system operates on a fundamentally different playbook to the United States of America's court of law, and personal bias can be inherited, through an 'old boys' club'.

See also 

 Bill of rights
 Constitutional economics
 Government by Judiciary
 Impact litigation
 Judicial review
 Kritarchy
 Letter and spirit of the law
 List of landmark court decisions in the United States
 Living Constitution
 Originalism
 Public interest litigation
 Philosophy of law
 Rule according to higher law
 Unconstitutional constitutional amendment
Certiorari

Notes

References
 Merriam-Webster's Dictionary of Law (1996), Merriam-Webster. 
 
 

Ginsberg, Benjamin, et al. We the People: an Introduction to American Politics. W.W. Norton & Company, 2017.

Further reading

Legal books
 Paul O. Carrese, 2003. The Cloaking of Power: Montesquieu, Blackstone, and the Rise of Judicial Activism (Chicago: University of Chicago Press).
 Duncan Kennedy, 1998. A Critique of Adjudication (Cambridge, MA: Harvard University Press).
 Carrol D. Kilgore, 1977. Judicial Tyranny: An Inquiry into the Integrity of the Federal Judiciary (Thomas Nelson). 
 Sterling Harwood, 1996.  Judicial Activism: A Restrained Defense (London: Austin & Winfield Publishers), 167pp. .
 Christopher Wolfe, 1997. Judicial Activism, 2nd ed. (Totowa, NJ: Rowman & Littfield Publishers, Inc.).
 Kenneth M. Holland, editor, 1991. Judicial Activism in Comparative Perspective (Palgrave Macmillan).
 Ronald Dworkin, 1988. Law's Empire (Cambridge, MA: Harvard University Press).
 Alexander M. Bickel, 1986. The Least Dangerous Branch 2nd ed. (New Haven, CT: Yale University Press).
 Arthur Selwyn Miller, 1982. Toward Increased Judicial Activism (Greenwood Press).
 Ronald Dworkin, 1977. Taking Rights Seriously (Cambridge, MA: Harvard University Press).
 Lino A. Graglia, 1976. Disaster by Decree (Ithaca, NY: Cornell University Press).
 Michael Rebell and Arthur R. Block, 1982. Educational Policy Making and the Courts: An Empirical Study of Judicial Activism (Chicago: University of Chicago Press).
 H. L. A. Hart, 1961. The Concept of Law (Oxford: Oxford University Press).

Hamlyn Lectures

Popular books
 Kermit Roosevelt, October 15, 2006. The Myth of Judicial Activism: Making Sense of Supreme Court Decisions (Yale University Press Publishers), 272pp. 
 James B. Kelly, July 30, 2006. Governing With the Charter: Legislative And Judicial Activism And Framer's Intent (Law and Society Series) (UBC Press Publishers), 336pp. 
 Rory Leishman, May 2006. Against Judicial Activism: The Decline of Freedom And Democracy in Canada (McGill-Queen's University Press Publishers), 310pp. 
 S. P. Sathe, December 2003. Judicial Activism in India (Oxford University Press Publishers), 406pp. 
 Robert Bork, 2003. Coercing Virtue: The Worldwide Rule of Judges (AEI Press) 
 Herman Schwartz, editor, 2002. The Rehnquist Court: Judicial Activism on the Right .
 David Gwynn Morgan, 2001. A Judgment Too Far? Judicial Activism and the Constitution (Cork University Press). 
 Bradley C. Canon and Charles A. Johnson, 1998. Judicial Policies: Implementation and Impact 2nd ed. (Congressional Quarterly Books).

 
Constitutional law
Activism by type
Sociology of law
Philosophy of law
Ethically disputed judicial practices
Conflict of interest
Rhetoric